The Kebena people (also spelled Qebena) are a Cushitic ethnic group found in the Gurage Zone of Ethiopia. They speak the Kebena language and area very similarly to the Kembata and Alaba people in terms of language and to the Gurages in term of culture. The Kebena live in the Gurage Zone. In the 19th century they were part of the Hadiya kingdom, in fact it was one of the two principalities of Hadya, an autonomous state ruled by Umar Baska. It became known as Kebena or Hadya Womba. It also became an important commercial and Islamic center under Baska rule. It was conquered by Menelik II soldiers after a fierce battle which was more of a religious nature. The Kebena subsist on agriculture. Unlike their southern kinsmen, the Hadya, the Kebena are followers of Islam. Kebena governors of their region were known as Garads, the most notable Garad was Hassan Injamo who led a resistance against Menelik's invasion.

Demographics
Based on the 2007 Census conducted by the CSA, the Kebena group has a total population of 74,379, of whom 37,231 are men and 37,148 women; none of the population were urban inhabitants.

Religion
The majority of the group were reported as Muslim, with 89.52% of the population reporting that belief, while 8.22% practiced Ethiopian Orthodox Christianity, and 1.91% were Protestants.

References

Ethnic groups in Ethiopia
Cushitic-speaking peoples